Ronald Worm (born 7 October 1953) is a German former international footballer who played as a striker.

Club career
Worm began his career at his hometown club MSV Duisburg, for which he made 231 appearances in the Bundesliga between 1971 and 1979, scoring 71 goals. In 1979, he was signed by Eintracht Braunschweig for a transfer fee of 1 million Deutsche Mark to replace Harald Nickel, who had just left the club for Borussia Mönchengladbach. He went on to play for Braunschweig until he retired from the game in 1987 after not receiving an offer for a new contract from the club.

International career
Worm was capped seven times for the West Germany national team between 1975 and 1978, scoring five goals. He was part of the West German squads for the 1976 Euro and 1978 World Cup, but did not play in either tournament.

Worm also competed for West Germany at the 1972 Summer Olympics.

International goals
Scores and results list West Germany's goal tally first, score column indicates score after each Worm goal. Germany's goal tally first:''

Coaching career
Since 2015, Worm manages Eintracht Braunschweig's women's team.

References

External links
 
 
 
 

1953 births
Living people
Footballers from Duisburg
Association football forwards
German footballers
German football managers
Germany international footballers
Germany under-21 international footballers
Germany youth international footballers
Germany B international footballers
MSV Duisburg players
Eintracht Braunschweig players
UEFA Euro 1976 players
1978 FIFA World Cup players
Bundesliga players
2. Bundesliga players
Olympic footballers of West Germany
West German footballers
Footballers at the 1972 Summer Olympics
TSV Havelse managers